5-methyltetrahydrofolate:corrinoid/iron-sulfur protein Co-methyltransferase (acsE (gene)) is an enzyme with systematic name 5-methyltetrahydrofolate:corrinoid/iron-sulfur protein methyltransferase. This enzyme catalyses the following chemical reaction

 [Methyl-Co(III) corrinoid Fe-S protein] + tetrahydrofolate  a [Co(I) corrinoid Fe-S protein] + 5-methyltetrahydrofolate

This enzyme catalyses the transfer of a methyl group from the N5 position of methyltetrahydrofolate to the 5-methoxybenzimidazolylcobamide cofactor of a corrinoid/Fe-S protein, containing a corrin ring similar to that in cobalamin.

References

External links 
 

EC 2.1.1